In Country is a 1989 American drama film produced and directed by Norman Jewison, starring Bruce Willis and Emily Lloyd. The screenplay by Frank Pierson and Cynthia Cidre was based on the novel by Bobbie Ann Mason. The original music score was composed by James Horner. Willis earned a best supporting actor Golden Globe nomination for his role.

Plot

Recent high school graduate Samantha Hughes, 17, lives in fictional Hopewell, Kentucky. Her uncle Emmett Smith, a laid-back Vietnam veteran, suffers from post-traumatic stress disorder. Samantha's father, Dwayne, was killed in Vietnam at 21 after marrying and impregnating Samantha's mother, Irene. Samantha finds some old photographs, medals, and letters of her father, and becomes obsessed with finding out more about him.

Irene, who has moved to Lexington, Kentucky with her second husband, wants Samantha to move in with them and go to college. But Samantha would rather stay with Emmett and try to find out more about her father. Her mother is no help, as she tells Samantha, "Honey, I married him a month before he left for the war. He was 19. I hardly even remember him." Finally, Samantha, Emmett and her grandmother visit the Vietnam Veterans Memorial in Washington, D.C. Finding her father's name in the memorial releases cathartic emotions in Samantha and her family.

Cast
 Bruce Willis as Emmett Smith
 Emily Lloyd as Samantha Hughes
 Joan Allen as Irene
 Kevin Anderson as Lonnie
 John Terry as Tom
 Peggy Rea as Mamaw
 Judith Ivey as Anita
 Daniel Jenkins as Dwayne
 Stephen Tobolowsky as Pete
 Jim Beaver as Earl Smith
 Richard Hamilton as Grandpaw
 Heidi Swedberg as Dawn
 Ken Jenkins as Jim Holly
 Jonathan Hogan as Larry
 Patricia Richardson as Cindy

Production

Casting
To prepare for her role, Emily Lloyd stayed with a lawyer and his family in Paducah, Kentucky. In order to get into the mindset of a girl whose father has died, the young actress thought of the death of her paternal grandfather, Charles Lloyd Pack, a British actor to whom she was very close. Lloyd underwent training to speak with a Kentucky accent in the film.

The veterans in the dance sequence are all actual Vietnam vets as well and their real family members accompany them.  Of the five major characters who are Vietnam veterans, only one, Earl, is played by an actual Vietnam veteran, Jim Beaver. Ken Jenkins, who plays Jim Holly (the organizer of the veteran's dance), is the father of Daniel Jenkins, who plays Samantha's father Dwayne in the Vietnam flashbacks. Their casting in the film was purely coincidental. The commencement speaker was played by Don Young, the minister of a large Baptist church in Paducah, Kentucky. In an interview with The Paducah Sun, he said the speech had been written for him but joked that it was so good, he might "borrow" parts of it in future sermons.

Filming
Much of the film was shot in Kentucky's far-western Jackson Purchase, where the original author, Bobbie Ann Mason, grew up. Her home of Graves County, specifically its county seat of Mayfield, was the location for many scenes. The walk-in doctor's office seen in the film is actually a dry cleaners which was renamed "Clothes Doctor" following its appearance in the film. Several other scenes were shot in the Purchase's largest city of Paducah, particularly the scenes inside Emmett's home.

Release
In Country had its world premiere on September 7, 1989 at the Toronto International Film Festival, which Bruce Willis attended and dedicated to Canadian war veterans who fought in
Vietnam.

Box office performance
The film was given a limited release on September 15, 1989 in four theaters grossing $36,505 on its opening weekend. It was given a wide release on September 29, 1989 in 606 theaters grossing $1.3 million on its opening weekend. It went on to make $3.5 million in North America.

Critical reception
In Country was generally well received by critics. It has a 68% rating on Rotten Tomatoes based on 28 reviews. Audiences polled by CinemaScore gave the film an average grade of "B" on an A+ to F scale.

Film critic Roger Ebert gave the film three out of four stars and wrote, "The movie is like a time bomb. You sit there, interested, absorbed, sometimes amused, sometimes moved, but wondering in the back of your mind what all of this is going to add up to. Then you find out". In his review for The Globe and Mail, Rick Groen praised Emily Lloyd's performance: "Emily Lloyd, the callow Brit who burned up the screen in Wish You Were Here, is letter perfect – her accent impeccable and her energy immense". USA Today gave the film three out of four stars and praised Bruce Willis' "subsidiary performance as Lloyd's reclusive guardian-uncle is admirably short on showboating". In his review for The Guardian, Derek Malcolm praised Lloyd for her "portrait is of a lively waif who does not intend to be easily defeated by the comedy of life without adding a few jokes of her own, and it is the most complete thing she has so far done on the screen, good as she was in Wish You Were Here". Time magazine felt that the script "perhaps pursues too many banal and inconsequential matters as it portrays teen life in a small town", but that "the film starts to gather force and direction when a dance, organized to honor the local Viet vets, works out awkwardly". Furthermore, its critic felt that the film was "a lovely, necessary little stitch in our torn time".

In her review for The New York Times, Caryn James criticized the "cheap and easy touches ... that reduce it to the shallowness of a television movie", and found James Horner's score, "offensive and distracting". Newsweek magazine's David Ansen wrote, "While one can respect its lofty intentions, the movie doesn't seem to have any better sense than its high-school heroine of just what it's looking for. At once underdramatized and faintly stagy, it keeps promising revelations that never quite materialize". In her review for the Washington Post, Rita Kempley wrote, "What's meant to be a cohesive family portrait, a suffering American microcosm, is a shambles of threads dangling and characters adrift. Jewison leaves it to stymied viewers to figure out the gist of it". Peter Travers from the Rolling Stone magazine considered In Country as "one of the year’s most emotionally shattering films."

References

External links
 
 
 
 
 

Films directed by Norman Jewison
1989 films
1989 drama films
1980s coming-of-age drama films
American coming-of-age drama films
Films about veterans
Films based on American novels
Films scored by James Horner
Films shot in Kentucky
Vietnam Veterans Memorial
1980s English-language films
1980s American films